Tom Costello is an Irish Labour Party politician. He was Mayor of Galway from 2007 to 2008.

Biography
A native of Castlegar, Costello became involved in politics in 1992 while working with Bus Éireann, becoming involved in trade unions and decided to become a councillor to be a reliable representative for the people of Galway and to try to bring about change.

External links
 https://web.archive.org/web/20071119083053/http://www.galwaycity.ie/AllServices/YourCouncil/HistoryofTheCityCouncil/PreviousMayors/
 http://www.galwayindependent.com/profiles/profiles/tom-costello-%11-galway-city-mayor/
 http://www.advertiser.ie/galway/article/8943

Politicians from County Galway
Mayors of Galway
Year of birth missing (living people)
Living people
Labour Party (Ireland) politicians
Local councillors in Galway (city)